Luther Pendragon is a London and New York-based public relations and communications agency.

History
Founded in 1992 by media journalist George Pitcher and television journalist Charles Stewart-Smith, and so named due to Pitcher's interest in Arthurian legends, the firm grew through the 1990s off the back of major and often controversial clients such as British Gas, Kimberly Clark, Holocaust Memorial Day and the Hinduja family. The company handles all media inquiries for the London and Winchester dioceses of the Church of England. Luther Pendragon lays claim to having developed the professional practice of issues management, but this is disputed in the PR industry.

In 2004 ex-civil servant Mike Granatt joined the consultancy. His clients included the Speaker of the House of Commons Michael Martin, a position from which Granatt resigned in February 2008, saying he had been misled over a scandal involving the Speaker's expenses. One of his clients in 2007 was the BBC Trust.

In 2005, the firm was subject to a management buy-out, said to be worth £11 million by the trade magazine PR Week. Current clients include Reuben Brothers.

Clients
 Diocese of London
 Diocese of Winchester
 Clariant
 Vizada

See also
George Pitcher
Reputation Management
Public Relations
Crisis Management
Corporate Strategy
Media training

References

External links
Company website

Consulting firms established in 1992
Companies based in the City of London
Public relations companies of the United Kingdom
Privately held companies based in London
1992 establishments in England
British companies established in 1992